Sant'Alessandro in Zebedia is a church in Milan, Italy.

History
The original church was built by the Barnabite order in the 9th century, on the ruins of the Pretorium which tradition holds was the prison that held the martyred Sant'Alessandro.

Its construction for the Barnabite order began in 1601 to a design by Lorenzo Binago, Francesco Maria Richini also contributing to the project. It comprises a principal building on the Greek cross plan with a central dome, and a separate presbytery which also has a dome. The façade, with decorations in bas-relief, has two campaniles.

The interior includes works by important Lombard Baroque artists including Camillo Procaccini (an Assumption, a Nativity and a Crucifixion) and Daniele Crespi (a Flagellation). There is also an altarpiece in the first chapel on the right by Ossana.

See also
 History of early modern period domes

Notes

17th-century Roman Catholic church buildings in Italy
Roman Catholic churches completed in 1601
Alessandro in Zebedia
Baroque architecture in Milan
1601 establishments in Italy